The 1973–74 season was the 50th season in the existence of AEK Athens F.C. and the 15th consecutive season in the top flight of Greek football. They competed in the Alpha Ethniki and the Greek Cup. The season began on 23 September 1973 and finished on 19 June 1974.

Overview

The 1973–74 season was another bad year for AEK Athens. The combination of administrative changes and financial difficulties left AEK out of claiming titles and distinctions for another year, while the equally bad previous season had left the team out of European competitions. In the administration, the then political regime proposed to the businessman, Loukas Barlos, the assignment of the presidency of AEK. He refused as he did not agree with the method of assignment and Dimitris Avramidis took over the chairmanship of the team for a short time and then Ioannis Theodorakopoulos. Added to all that, was the departure from the bench of AEK, after five consecutive seasons, of Branko Stanković, during the last season. He was succeeded by the Englishman Stan Anderson, a former international midfielder, who his only coaching service was at Middlesbrough from 1966, until he came to AEK.

AEK finished for the second consecutive year in 5th place in the standings, at a distance of 19 points from the top, while in the Greek Cup they were eliminated at the round of 16 with a 3–1 defeat by PAOK, who eventually won the title.

Players

Squad information

NOTE: The players are the ones that have been announced by the AEK Athens' press release. No edits should be made unless a player arrival or exit is announced. Updated 30 June 1974, 23:59 UTC+2.

Transfers

In

Out

Renewals

Overall transfer activity

Expenditure:  ₯0

Income:  ₯0

Net Total:  ₯0

Pre-season and friendlies

Alpha Ethniki

League table

Results summary

Results by Matchday

Fixtures

Greek Cup

Matches

Statistics

Squad statistics

! colspan="9" style="background:#FFDE00; text-align:center" | Goalkeepers
|-

! colspan="9" style="background:#FFDE00; color:black; text-align:center;"| Defenders
|-

! colspan="9" style="background:#FFDE00; color:black; text-align:center;"| Midfielders
|-

! colspan="9" style="background:#FFDE00; color:black; text-align:center;"| Forwards
|-

|}

Disciplinary record

|-
! colspan="14" style="background:#FFDE00; text-align:center" | Goalkeepers

|-
! colspan="14" style="background:#FFDE00; color:black; text-align:center;"| Defenders

|-
! colspan="14" style="background:#FFDE00; color:black; text-align:center;"| Midfielders

|-
! colspan="14" style="background:#FFDE00; color:black; text-align:center;"| Forwards

|}

References

External links
AEK Athens F.C. Official Website

AEK Athens F.C. seasons
AEK Athens